Robert Alan Morrow (born September 21, 1962) is an American actor and director. He is known for his portrayal of Dr. Joel Fleischman on Northern Exposure, a role that garnered him three Golden Globe and two Emmy nominations for Best Actor in a Dramatic Series, and later for his role as FBI agent Don Eppes on Numb3rs.

Early life 
Morrow was born in New Rochelle, New York, the son of Diane Francis (née Markowitz), a dental hygienist, and Murray Morrow, an industrial lighting manufacturer. He is Jewish, and had a Reform Bar Mitzvah. Morrow grew up in Hartsdale, New York.  His parents divorced when he was nine years old. He attended Cardigan Mountain School and Edgemont High School and dropped out at the beginning of his senior year to begin his acting career.

Career 
Morrow's film career began when he appeared as an extra at age 18 on Saturday Night Live. He co-starred alongside Johnny Depp in Private Resort (1985).  He later appeared in the Dentyne gum commercials where he would slyly utter the "Time to walk the dog" catch phrase.

Morrow played the lead role in the television show Northern Exposure from 1990 to 1995. Morrow's character, Joel Fleischman, is "a New York City physician who is surprised to be assigned to the isolated and icy town of Cicely, Alaska". For his work on Northern Exposure, Morrow was nominated for three Golden Globe Awards and two Emmy Awards. He left the CBS comedy-drama in 1995 to act in movies.

Morrow starred in the critically acclaimed film Quiz Show (1994) as Dick Goodwin, a congressional investigator intent on uncovering the corruption behind the 1950s game show scandal. Morrow played the younger brother of Albert Brooks' character in Mother (1996). In 2000, he directed and starred in Maze, about an artist with Tourette syndrome.

In 2002, Morrow played Kevin Hunter on the Showtime television series Street Time. He also appeared in the television film Custody. In 2007, he played Jack Nicholson's doctor, Dr. Hollins, in The Bucket List. From 2005 to 2010, he starred with David Krumholtz and Judd Hirsch as FBI agent Don Eppes in Numb3rs on CBS. On March 8, 2010, it was announced that Morrow had signed on to star in Jerry Bruckheimer's new series, The Whole Truth, on ABC. The series aired on September 13, 2010, but was pulled from the ABC schedule in December. Morrow filmed 13 episodes. Morrow starred as Henry Rearden in Atlas Shrugged: Part III, which was released September 12, 2014. In 2017, Morrow starred in the recurring role of reporter Abe Leonard in the first season of the ABC political drama Designated Survivor. He also starred in The People v. O. J. Simpson: American Crime Story as Barry Scheck. As of November 2018, news was released that a revival of Northern Exposure was in the works at CBS and that Morrow would return as Joel Fleischman.

Morrow has a recurring role on the Showtime drama Billions as judge Adam DeGiulio.

Morrow is a teacher at the Ruskin Group Theatre in Santa Monica. During the summer of 2019, he starred as Willy Loman in the theater's production of Death of a Salesman.

Personal life 
On his 36th birthday in 1998, Morrow married actress Debbon Ayer. They have one daughter, Tu Morrow, born in 2001. They live in Santa Monica, California. Morrow previously lived in Seattle at the time of filming Northern Exposure.

Acting credits

Film

Television

Directing credits

References

External links 

 
 
 

1968 births
Living people
American male film actors
American male television actors
American television directors
Jewish American male actors
Male actors from New Rochelle, New York
20th-century American male actors
21st-century American male actors
21st-century American Jews